Częstochowa City Council is a unicameral governing body of the city of Częstochowa, the second biggest city in Silesian Voivodeship. It consists of 28 councilors elected in free elections for a five-year term (since 2018). The current chairman of the council is Zdzisław Wolski (SLD).

Election results

2018
All 28 seats on the city council were being contested in the 2018 election.

2014
All 28 seats on the city council were being contested in the 2014 election.

2010
All 28 seats on the city council were being contested in the 2010 election.

2006
All 28 seats on the city council were being contested in the 2006 election.

2002
All 28 seats on the city council were being contested in the 2002 election.

See also 

History of Częstochowa
List of mayors of Częstochowa

References

City councils in Poland
Częstochowa